Áprily Lajos High School is a Romanian state school located in Centrul Vechi, a neighborhood of Brașov, Romania. The school educates children aged between 5 (grade 0) and 19 years old (grade 12). Named after Hungarian poet Lajos Áprily, the school the only Hungarian-language high school in Brașov. 

Since its founding as a Roman Catholic gymnasium in 1837, the school has hosted a number of significant Romanian and Hungarian personalities as both students and teachers.

Schools in Brașov
Educational institutions established in 1837
Hungarian-language schools in Romania